Sameer P. Sarkar is a consultant in psychiatry and forensic psychiatry, almost entirely in private practice. He trained in forensic psychiatry at the Maudsley Hospital, London and the University of Massachusetts Amherst. In addition, he studied law at Harvard University and at Northumbria University. He teaches psychiatric ethics at two London medical schools. He sits on the Ethics committee of the Royal College of Psychiatrists and previously also sat on the college's Law committee.

Sarkar has published widely on psychiatric ethics in general and his special interest lies in the legal and ethical aspects of confidentiality. He has written in Journal of American Academy of Psychiatry & Law and in various journals of the Royal College. He has recently been appointed a member of the National DNA Database Ethics Group set up by the Home Office.

Specialties

Sarkar's main research interest is the subject of mental health detainees' access to due process. His writings on professional boundary violation led to him being instructed as an expert for a recent government inquiry dealing with sexual abuse by psychiatrists.

His practice is limited to General Adult Psychiatry, adult ADHD and medico-legal work.

Honors and awards

 Editorial Board- Journal of the American Academy of Psychiatry and the Law, 2007–2010
 Editorial Board-Journal of Ethics in Mental Health, 2006–09
 Awarded level 4 of the Clinical Excellence Awards in NHS –2004, 2006
 Accorded proxime accessit by the Psychotherapy Faculty of the Royal College of Psychiatrists, for the Psychotherapy Prize 2003 for paper- "The other 23 hours- Special problems of psychotherapy in a 'Special' hospital"

References

 Dr. Sarkar's Public Profile in LinkedIn
 COMPASS PSYCARE LTD.

Alumni of Northumbria University
University of Massachusetts Amherst alumni
Harvard Law School alumni
Living people
British psychiatrists
Year of birth missing (living people)